John Robinson, D.D. (died 1598) was an English priest and academic in the second half of the 16th century.

Robinson was born in Richmondshire and educated at Pembroke College, Cambridge. He was President of St John's College, Oxford, from 1564 to 1572.  He held livings at East Treswell, Fulbeck, Thornton, Great Easton, Brant Broughton, Fishtoft, Caistor, Kingston Bagpuze, Little Gransden (1587-97) and Somersham. Robinson became Precentor of Lincoln Cathedral in 1573; and Archdeacon of Bedford in 1574, holding both positions until his death in 1598.

Notes

References

1598 deaths
Lincoln Cathedral
People from Richmondshire (district)
Presidents of St John's College, Oxford
Fellows of Pembroke College, Cambridge
Archdeacons of Bedford
16th-century English Anglican priests